V. K. Garg is dean of the School of Environment And Earth Sciences, Central University Of Punjab, Bathinda. He is also dean of students welfare of CUPB. He visited EPFL, Lausanne, Switzerland, in 2015 as visiting scientist, Deakin University, Geelong, Australia, in January–February 2014 under TEQIP-II Programme.

Education and career
He attended Kurukshetra University, Kurukshetra  in 1985 and completed his B.Sc. in biology. In 1987 he did M.Sc. in chemistry from Chaudhary Charan Singh Haryana Agricultural University, Hisar. He remained there for Ph.D., which he completed in 1992. He started his career as assistant scientist (1992–1996) in the Department of Agronomy, CCS Haryana Agricultural University, Hisar. After working there he joined the Department of Environmental Science and Engineering, Guru Jambheshwar University of Science and Technology, Hisar as associate professor (1996–2004), professor (2004–2016). He moved in 2016 to the Central University of Punjab, where he is serving in various capacities.

Works 
He has guided 17 doctorate students and more than 150 research papers are to his credit.

Awards 
 In 2007, received top Reviewer Award by Elsevier.
 In 2010, he received outstanding Reviewer Award from Elsevier. 
 In 2011, received award for highest citations of Research work Fellow, Biotech Research Society of India.
 In 2012, Thomson Reuters India Citation Award.
 In 2013, received outstanding Reviewer Award from Elsevier.

References

External links

20th-century Indian scientists
Living people
Year of birth missing (living people)
Indian conservationists
Water conservation in India
20th-century Indian educational theorists
21st-century Indian educational theorists